Serhiy Oleksiyovych Taruta (born 22 July 1955 in Vynohradne, Donetsk Oblast, Ukrainian SSR) is a Ukrainian politician and current member of the Ukrainian parliament, Ukrainian businessman, sometimes called an oligarch, founder of Industrial Union of Donbas, former President of FC Metalurh Donetsk, and the former governor of Donetsk Oblast.

Biography
Serhiy Taruta was born in Mariupol in 1955 and was a successful cyclist in his youth; he later claimed that he rode an average of 120 kilometres a day. He studied at Pryazovskyi State Technical University before going on to work at the large Ukrainian metal plant, Azovstal.

Business career
In 1995, Serhiy Taruta left Azovstal for "Azovintex", a foreign trade company he co-founded. In December, 1995 he was appointed the CEO of the Industrial Union of Donbass Corporation (ISD Corporation), which he co-founded. Between 2001 and 2014, Taruta served as the Chairman of the Board of ISD Corporation.

Political career
In 1998 and 2002 Serhiy Taruta was elected a member of the Donetsk Regional City Council for Telmanovsky electoral district, Donetsk Region.

On 2 March 2014, amidst the 2014 pro-Russian conflict in Ukraine, acting President Oleksandr Turchynov appointed Taruta Governor of Donetsk Oblast. On 10 October 2014, President Petro Poroshenko removed him from office, replacing him with Oleksandr Kikhtenko.

In the 2014 Ukrainian parliamentary election, as an independent candidate Taruta won a single-member district in Mariupol with 60.00% of the vote and is thus a member of the Ukrainian parliament since 27 November 2014.

Taruta leads the Group for Inter-parliamentary Ties between Ukraine and Germany.

He is also the Head of the Sub-Committee for Protection of Historic and Cultural Heritage of the Parliamentary Committee for Culture and Spiritual Affairs.

Taruta is the co-chair of the Parliamentary Platform for the Future of Donbass, a body that aims to develop new legislative initiatives to help solve problems related to the reintegration of occupied territories of the region.

He is the author of the Three Pillars peace plan for Donbass, and also proposed the creation of the Vienna Format for Donbass peace talks.

Taruta led the group of developers of Sustainable Development Doctrine Ukraine 2030.

Serhiy Taruta is a founder of the political party "Osnova".

On 22 September 2018, Osnova nominated Taruta as the party's candidate for the 2019 Ukrainian presidential election. On 16 March (2 weeks and one day before the election) Taruta pledged his campaign-team would support fellow  candidate Yulia Tymoshenko's campaign efforts. However, his name was not taken of the ballot. (7 March was the last day when candidates could withdraw their names from the ballot.)

In the July 2019 Ukrainian parliamentary election Taruta was placed second on the party list of Fatherland. He was elected to parliament.

References

External links
 
Biography at taruta.net

1955 births
Living people
People from Donetsk Oblast
Pryazovskyi State Technical University alumni
Governors of Donetsk Oblast
Ukrainian oligarchs
Ukrainian billionaires
Ukrainian philanthropists
People of the annexation of Crimea by the Russian Federation
Pro-Ukrainian people of the 2014 pro-Russian unrest in Ukraine
FC Metalurh Donetsk
Ukrainian football chairmen and investors
Recipients of the Order of Merit (Ukraine), 2nd class
Recipients of the Order of Merit (Ukraine), 3rd class
Eighth convocation members of the Verkhovna Rada
Ninth convocation members of the Verkhovna Rada
Independent politicians of Batkivshchyna
Candidates in the 2019 Ukrainian presidential election
Industrial Union of Donbas